The Mississippi Mound Trail is a driving tour of 33 sites adjoining U.S. Route 61 where indigenous peoples of the Mississippi Delta built earthworks. The mounds were primarily built between 500 and 1500 AD, but are representative of a variety of cultures known as the Mound Builders. Each site has a historical marker and is accessible by road.

Opened in 2016, the trail was a joint venture between the Mississippi Department of Archives and History, the Mississippi Department of Transportation and various other stakeholders.

Mississippi Mound Trail sites

Source: Mississippi Mound Trail official web site

References

External links
 Official website

Mississippian culture
Tourist attractions in Mississippi
Native American history of Mississippi
Mounds in Mississippi